Oscar Roël Brandon (born 8 August 1971) is a Surinamese badminton player, coach and Olympic team manager. He competed for Suriname at the 1996 Summer Olympics as a badminton player in the Men's singles event. And he was "chef de mission" (team manager) for Suriname at the 2012 Summer Olympics in London and the 2016 Summer Olympics in Rio de Janeiro.

Early years
At the age of six Oscar Brandon accompanied his dad to the badminton "Ismay van Wilgen sportshall" and when he turned 12 years old became a member of the SCVU (Sociaal Culturele Vereniging Uitvlugt) badminton club at the outskirts of the city of Paramaribo. There he nurtured his talent under guidance and supervision of trainer and coach "Ma Lefi". He quickly became a junior champ and was then soon included in the National Juniors Squad of Suriname for centralized training.

Career
His first big international success came in 1988 as a junior player winning the Carebaco juniors event in boys singles. In 1990 he reached the semi-finals in Men's Singles at the 1990 CACSO Games in Mexico City. Unfortunately he lost the semi-final against experienced home player Ernesto de La Torre and then he lost the bronze medal match against Jamaican Robert Richards. After a short period of training and playing tournaments in the Netherlands, he decided to play a full year of badminton competition abroad in the Netherlands. There he was part of the famous BV van Zijderveld club in Amstelveen. He won a record of ten National Men's Singles titles, the first in 1991 and then was undisputed from 1993 till 2001. In 1996 he received a wildcard to participate at the 1996 Summer Olympics a first in badminton for Suriname. At the Atlanta Olympics he would also become the first Olympic torch bearer for his country, participating in the Olympic Torch Relay in Miami. In the Men's Singles event at the 1996 Summer Olympics he lost his first match against Jamie Dawson of Canada 5–15, 4–15. In 1998 he became "Sportsman of the Year" in Suriname after reaching the 62nd place on the badminton world ranking, by winning the first edition of the Suriname International and reaching the final of the Argentina International. That year 1998 he also won both the Argentina International and Brazil International São Paulo Cup 1998 in the mixed doubles event with Adrienn Kocsis a former Hungarian player playing for Peru. In 1999 Oscar Brandon participated in both the Pan Am Games and the World Championships, a first for his country Suriname. Once again in 1999 he was chosen to be "Sportsman of the Year" in Suriname.  In 2001 he was crowned "Badminton player of the century" in his native Suriname.

Achievements

1985
Winner at the Carebaco Juniors Boys Doubles with Marlon Djojodiwongso of Suriname

1988
Winner at the Carebaco Juniors Boys Singles
Winner at the Carebaco Juniors Boys Doubles with Eric Bleau of Suriname
Runner-Up at the Carebaco Juniors Mixed Doubles
Most Valuable Player Juniors Carebaco 1988

1989
Winner (Golden medal) at the Junior Carifta Games 1989 Boys Single
Runner-Up (Silver medal) at the Junior Carifta Games 1989 Boys Doubles with Eric Bleau of Suriname
Semi-Final (Bronze medal) at the Junior Carifta Games 1989 Mixed Doubles with Letitia Wongsodimedjo of Suriname

1990
4th Place at the 1990 CACSO Games Men's Singles

1992
Winner at the Caribbean Easter Tournament Curacao Men's Singles 
Semi-Final at the Carebaco International Men's Singles 
Quarter-Final at the Carebaco International Men's Doubles with Veron Griffiths of Jamaica
Quarter-Final at the Carebaco International Mixed Doubles with E. Hoeymaakers of Curacao

1995
First round at the Pan Am Games Men's Singles

1996
First round at the 1996 Summer Olympics Men's Singles

1997
Quarter-Final at the Peru International Men's Singles and Men's Doubles with Alejandro Elias of Peru
Semi-Final at the Carebaco International Men's Doubles with Eric Bleau of Suriname
Quarter-Final at the Carebaco International Men's Singles 
Quarter-Final at the Guatemala International Men's Singles and Men's Doubles with Anil Seepaul of Trinidad & Tobago
Semi-Final at the Guatemala International Mixed Doubles with Shackera Cupidon of Jamaica

1998
Quarter-Final at the Peru International Men's Doubles with Pieter van Soerland of the Netherlands
Quarter-Final at the Peru International Mixed Doubles with Nigella Saunders of Jamaica
Runner-Up at the Carebaco International Mixed Doubles with Nathalie Haynes of Suriname
Semi-Final at the Carebaco International Men's Singles and Men's Doubles with Derrick Stjeward of Suriname
Winner at the Brazil International São Paulo Cup 1998 Mixed Doubles with Adrienn Kocsis of Peru 
Semi-Final at the Brazil International São Paulo Cup 1998 Men's Doubles with Leandro Santos of Brazil
Runner-Up at the South American Badminton Championships  Men's Doubles with Derrick Stjeward of Suriname
Runner-Up at the Argentina International Men's Singles
Winner at the Argentina International Mixed Doubles with Adrienn Kocsis of Peru
Semi-Final at the Argentina International Men's Doubles with Jorge Meyer of Argentina
Winner at the Suriname International Men's Singles
Semi-Final at the Suriname International Men's Doubles with Derrick Stjeward of Suriname
Quarter-Final at the Suriname International Mixed Doubles with Nathalie Haynes of Suriname

1999
Qualification round at the 1999 IBF World Championships Men's Singles and Men's Doubles with Derrick Stjeward of Suriname
First round at the Pan Am Games Men's Singles and Men's Doubles with Derrick Stjeward of Suriname
Second round at the Pan Am Games Mixed Doubles with Nathalie Haynes of Suriname
Quarter-Final at the Carebaco International Men's Singles and Men's Doubles with Derrick Stjeward of Suriname
Semi-Final at the Jamaica International Mixed Doubles with Kristal Karjohn of Jamaica

2001
Semi-Final at the Carebaco International Men's Singles

2003
Semi-Final at the Suriname International Mixed Doubles with Stephanie Jadi of Suriname

2008
Semi-Final at the Suriname International Men's Doubles with Jair Liew of Suriname

2009
Runner-Up at the Suriname International Men's Doubles with Raul Rampersad of Trinidad & Tobago
Semi-Final at the Suriname International Mixed Doubles with Danielle Melchiot of Suriname

2013
Semi-Final at the Suriname International Mixed Doubles with Stephanie Jadi of Suriname

Achievements with results

BWF International Challenge/Series 
Men's singles

Men's doubles

Mixed doubles

 BWF International Challenge tournament
 BWF International Series tournament
 BWF Future Series tournament

Post-playing career
After his active career Oscar Brandon became a badminton coach,  team manager and politician for his country.  In November 1998 he was chosen as a member of the National Assembly, the Parliament, representing the legislative branch of government in Suriname. He is also a member of the Suriname Olympic Committee and took up the "chef de mission" (team manager) role for Suriname at the 2010 Central American and Caribbean Games, the 2010 Summer Youth Olympics, the 2010 South American Games, the 2012 Summer Olympics, the 2014 Central American and Caribbean Games, the 2014 South American Games, the 2014 Summer Youth Olympics, the 2015 Pan American Games  and the 2016 Summer Olympics.

Personal life 
Oscar Brandon is married and the couple have a son Shawn, who occasionally also participated in the National Badminton Circuit of Suriname and was also selected as a junior international to participate in the Carebaco Games.

References

External links
 

Surinamese male badminton players
Badminton players at the 1996 Summer Olympics
Olympic badminton players of Suriname
Badminton players at the 1999 Pan American Games
Badminton players at the 1995 Pan American Games
Pan American Games competitors for Suriname
Competitors at the 1990 Central American and Caribbean Games
Sportspeople from Paramaribo
1971 births
Living people